Guignardia festiva is a plant pathogen that has been recorded on Sumbaviopsis albicans.

References

Fungal plant pathogens and diseases
Botryosphaeriales
Fungi described in 1912
Taxa named by Hans Sydow
Taxa named by Paul Sydow